"Time Stand Still" is a song by Canadian progressive rock band Rush, featured on their 1987 album Hold Your Fire. Released as a single in 1987, credited to "Rush (featuring Aimee Mann)," "Time Stand Still" peaked at No. 3 on the U.S. mainstream rock charts on November 6, 1987. It was also a minor hit single in the United Kingdom, peaking at No. 42 on the Singles Chart. A music video for the song was directed by Zbigniew Rybczyński.

Development and composition
"Time Stand Still" was the first track Neil Peart wrote for Hold Your Fire. According to Peart, he wrote the lyrics for "Time Stand Still" based on his time with Rush:

"Time Stand Still" is in the key of E major.  The tempo is moderately fast. The song starts in  before going to common time by the first verse. 'Til Tuesday frontwoman Aimee Mann briefly sings in each chorus of the song, marking Rush's first collaboration with another vocalist, with Rush guitarist Alex Lifeson adding that the band thought a female singer "would suit the song". Initially, the band had hoped to recruit Cyndi Lauper to sing the part, then later approached the Pretenders' Chrissie Hynde because, according to Lifeson, "we thought she'd be perfect. But Chrissie was unavailable at the time." Rush later recruited Mann and paid her $2,000 to sing on the track, with Lifeson saying that "her voice blends with Geddy [Lee]'s perfectly and I think it creates the right atmosphere for the song. It's just something new for Rush."

Critical reception
In 2013, Popmatters writer Adrian Begrand listed "Time Stand Still" at #8 on his "10 Songs That Will Make You Love Rush", calling it "Rush’s best pop moment."

Music video

The song's music video was directed by Polish filmmaker Zbigniew Rybczyński. According to the editor of the video, Glenn Lazzaro:

Aimee Mann appears with the band in the video, which was filmed over the course of an entire day.

Live performances
The song was performed on the tours for the albums Hold Your Fire, Presto, Roll the Bones, and Counterparts. After not being played live for 16 years, it was included in the set list for the 2010-2011 Time Machine Tour. Live recordings of the song appear on the albums A Show of Hands (1988) and Time Machine 2011: Live in Cleveland (2011).

Charts

See also
Rush: Time Stand Still, a documentary film about the band's 2015 R40 Live Tour 
List of songs recorded by Rush

References

Rush (band) songs
Aimee Mann songs
Nelly Furtado songs
Songs written for films
1987 singles
1987 songs
Music videos directed by Zbigniew Rybczyński
Songs written by Neil Peart
Songs written by Geddy Lee
Songs written by Alex Lifeson
Mercury Records singles
Song recordings produced by Peter Collins (record producer)
Anthem Records singles